The 2015 FIA Cross Country Rally World Cup season is the 23rd season of the FIA Cross Country Rally World Cup.

Calendar

The calendar for the 2015 season features ten rallies. Some of the rallies are also part of the FIM Cross-Country Rallies World Championship and the FIM Bajas World Cup.

The six Bajas award 30 points to the winner, whereas the other four events are worth 60 points for the winner.

Results

Championship standings
In order to score points in the Cup classifications, competitors must register with the FIA before the entry closing date of the first rally/baja entered.
Points system
 Points for final positions are awarded as per the following table:

Drivers' championship
Any driver is required to participate in at least one Baja and one Cross-Country event in order to be able to score points for the FIA World Cup.

A total of 79 drivers have scored championship points.

References

External links
 

Cross Country Rally World Cup
Cross Country Rally World Cup